Jhanak Shukla (born 24 January 1996) is an Indian former child actress.

Early life
Shukla is the daughter of documentary filmmaker Haril Shukla and actress Supriya Shukla. Jhanak has completed her MA in Archaeology from Deccan College Post-Graduate and Research Institute.

Career
Shukla's greatest success to date is her character 'Gia Kapur' in the Bollywood movie Kal Ho Na Ho, alongside Shahrukh Khan, Saif Ali Khan and Preity Zinta, where she plays the adopted daughter of Jenny Kapur, played by Jaya Bachchan.

In 2006, she starred with Rajit Kapoor, Konkona Sen Sharma and Irrfan Khan in the movie Deadline: Sirf 24 Ghante as the kidnapped daughter 'Anishka Goenka'.

Jhanak also played a part in the Hollywood movie One Night with the King.

She also modeled for several advertisements like for 'ICICI' and a music video with Parikrama (band). She played the lead role in Star Plus's series Karishma Kaa Karishma (Remake of Small Wonder) and been a part of Son Pari. She also featured in series Hatim as little Jasmine acted in Gumrah a reality based crime thriller and the Malayalam serial Aalipazham meaning the hailstone.

She had been signed for a pivotal role in Sanjay Leela Bhansali's movie Black. However, she opted out since the dates would clash with Karishma Ka Karishma.

Filmography

Television

References

External links 
 

Indian child actresses
Living people
Actresses in Malayalam television
1996 births